The following are international rankings of Egypt.

Cities
GaWC Inventory of World Cities, 1999: Cairo 2 points: Evidence of world city formation

Economic
 The Wall Street Journal and the Heritage Foundation: Index of Economic Freedom 2007, ranked 127 out of 157 countries
Free the World: Economic Freedom of the World 2007, ranked 76 out of 141
International Monetary Fund: GDP (nominal) per capita 2007, ranked 115 out of 179 countries
International Monetary Fund: GDP (nominal) 2006, ranked 51 out of 181 countries
World Economic Forum: Global Competitiveness Index 2006–2007, ranked 63 out of 125 countries
World Bank: Ease of Doing Business Index, ranked 126 out of 178 countries

Environmental
Yale University: Environmental Sustainability Index 2005, ranked 115 out of 146 countries
New Economics Foundation: Happy Planet Index 2006, ranked 97 out of 178 countries

Demographics

Energy
Electricity production ranked 27 out of 211 countries 
Electricity consumption ranked 30 out of 190 countries 
Natural gas production ranked 20 out of 86 countries 
Natural gas consumption ranked 23 out of 211 countries 
Natural gas proven reserves ranked 18 out of 87 countries

Military

Political
 Transparency International: Corruption Perceptions Index 2019, ranked 105 out of 179 countries
Reporters Without Borders: Worldwide press freedom index 2020, ranked 166 out of 169 countries
Economist Intelligence Unit: Democracy Index 2019, ranked 137 out of 169 countries
Fund for Peace and Foreign Policy magazine: Failed States Index 2019, ranked 35 out of 177 countries

Social

Technological

Other

See also
List of Egypt-related topics
Lists of countries
Lists by country

References

Egypt